Zeta Piscis Austrini, Latinized from ζ Piscis Austrini, is an orange-hued star in the southern constellation of Piscis Austrinus. It has an apparent visual magnitude of +6.43, which is near the lower limit of stars that can be seen with the naked eye. Based upon an annual parallax shift of 7.55 mas as seen from the Gaia telescope, the star is located 413 ± 2 light years from the Sun. This is an evolved K-type giant star with a stellar classification of K1 III. It is a suspected variable star.

References

K-type giants
Piscis Austrinus
Piscis Austrini, Zeta
Durchmusterung objects
213296
111138
8570